Eric Alan Greco (born 1975) is an American bridge player. He is from Annandale, Virginia.

Bridge accomplishments

Awards

 ACBL King or Queen of Bridge (1) 1993

Wins

 North American Bridge Championships (20)
 von Zedtwitz Life Master Pairs (2) 1998, 2019 
 Silodor Open Pairs (1) 1997 
 Wernher Open Pairs (2) 2002, 2003 
 Nail Life Master Open Pairs (1) 2002 
 Jacoby Open Swiss Teams (1) 2010 
 Roth Open Swiss Teams (3) 2007, 2012, 2015 
 Reisinger (2) 2003, 2021 
 Spingold (2) 2005, 2010 
Mitchell Board-a-Match Teams (1) 2018
Vanderbilt Trophy (1) 2018
Norman Kay Platinum Pairs (1) 2016
Edgar Kaplan Blue Ribbon Pairs (1) 2017
ACBL Player of the Year (2) 2016, 2018

Runners-up

 North American Bridge Championships (11)
 von Zedtwitz Life Master Pairs (2) 2008, 2022 
 Blue Ribbon Pairs (3) 2003, 2012, 2016 
 Jacoby Open Swiss Teams (1) 2003 
 Vanderbilt (4) 2007, 2009, 2012, 2015 
 Keohane North American Swiss Teams (1) 2002

Notes

External links
 

1975 births
Living people
American contract bridge players
People from Annandale, Virginia
Date of birth missing (living people)
Place of birth missing (living people)